Dengie is a hundred in the county of Essex, England.

It corresponded to the Dengie peninsula, with the inland, western boundary running from North Fambridge to just west of Maldon. It was known at the time of Domesday as Witbrictesherna (Wibrihtesherne) Hundred until the hundred court changed its meeting location.

See also
Hundreds of Essex

References

Hundreds of Essex